This is a list of seasons played by Busan I Park Football Club in South Korean and Asian football, from 1983 to the most recent completed season. It details the club's achievements in major competitions, and the top scorers for each season. Top scorers in bold were also the top scorers in the South Korean league that season. 

The club has won the K-League 4 times, the KFA Cup 1 time, the K-League Cup 3 times and the AFC Champions League once.

Seasons

Key

P = Played
W = Games won
D = Games drawn
L = Games lost
F = Goals for
A = Goals against
Pts = Points
Pos = Final position

KSL = Korean Super League
KPFL = Korea Professional Football League
LC = League Cup
SC = League Cup (Supplementary)
Af-AsCC = Afro-Asian Club Championship
ACWC = Asian Cup Winners' Cup
ACC = Asian Club Championship
ACL = AFC Champions League
1S = First Stage
2S = Second Stage

n/a = Not applicable
DNQ = Did Not Qualify
R1 = Round 1
R2 = Round 2
GS = Group Stage
QF = Quarter-finals 
SF = Semi-finals
RU = Runners-up
W = Winners

References